MS Arcadia is a cruise ship in the P&O Cruises fleet. The ship was built by Fincantieri at their shipyard in Marghera, Italy. The ship officially entered service with the company in April 2005 and was named by Dame Kelly Holmes.

Design and description
Arcadia along with Aurora are adult only ships.

Arcadia uses the ABB Azipod system which is an azimuthing electric propulsion drive where the propulsion motor is installed inside a submerged azimuthing (unlimited 360 degrees) pod and coupled directly to an extremely short propeller shaft. The variable speed electric (AC/AC) drive produces smooth torque over the entire speed range including zero speed. The Azipod propulsion system gives the ship excellent manoeuvring capabilities. It allows full turns at high speed with a radius of less than a ship length. Almost equal speed can be achieved ahead and astern. Rudders as well as stern thrusters are obsolete if an Azipod propulsion is installed astern as it is capable of providing full thrust in all directions by setting the unit's direction angle simply with the vessel's steering control. The Azipod unit has no mechanical propulsion coupling as electric power is provided by a cable connection only, from the diesel-electric generators to the electric motor installed in the gondola directly behind the propeller. Arcadia has two ABB "AMZ 1250ZM12 LAEZ" Azipod units, with a motor power of 17.6MW.

Construction and career
Arcadia was ordered by Holland America Line in 2000 as their fifth  vessel. In 2003 she was allocated to Cunard Line to become their . Shortly before her launch the decision was made to transfer the ship to the P&O Cruises fleet.

Arcadia underwent a scheduled, 24-day refit at Lloyd Werft shipyard in Bremerhaven, Germany in 2008. She underwent a major refit to the stern, with 34 cabins added.

Arcadia was again refitted at Lloyd Werft in 2017.

COVID-19 pandemic
During the 2020-21 coronavirus layoff, the vessel spent some time moored off Bournemouth, Southwold and Torbay.

See also
  - a similar class of Panamax ships operated by Carnival Cruise Lines.
  - a similar class of Panamax ships operated by Royal Caribbean International
  - a similar class of Panamax ships operated by Holland America Line
 Signature-class cruise ship - a similar class of Panamax ships operated by Holland America Line
  and  - A similar set of Panamax ships operated by Princess Cruises
  and  - A set of Panamax ships built for Costa Cruises and currently operated by Costa Cruises and Carnival Cruise Line, derived from the Spirit class and Vista-class designs.

References

External links 

 P&O Cruises Arcadia Ship

2004 ships
Panamax cruise ships
Ships built by Fincantieri
Ships built in Venice
Ships of P&O Cruises
Passenger ships of Bermuda